The 2010–11 season is Maccabi Haifa's 53rd season in Israeli Premier League, and their 29th consecutive season in the top division of Israeli football.

UEFA Europa League

Qualification

Toto Cup

Group stage

Quarter-final

Ligat Ha'Al

Regular season

Top playoff

Israel State Cup

External links
 Maccabi Haifa website

Maccabi Haifa F.C. seasons
Maccabi Haifa